The 2000 Frankfurt Galaxy season was the eighth season for the franchise in the NFL Europe League (NFLEL). The team was led by head coach Dick Curl in his third year, and played its home games at Waldstadion in Frankfurt, Germany. They finished the regular season in fifth place with a record of four wins and six losses.

Offseason

Free agent draft

Personnel

Staff

Roster

Schedule

Standings

Notes

References

Frankfurt
Frankfurt Galaxy seasons